Bosnasco is a comune (municipality) in the Province of Pavia in the Italian region Lombardy, located about 45 km southeast of Milan and about 20 km southeast of Pavia. As of 31 December 2004, it had a population of 616 and an area of 4.8 km².

Bosnasco borders the following municipalities: Arena Po, Castel San Giovanni, Montù Beccaria, San Damiano al Colle, Zenevredo.

Demographic evolution

References 

Cities and towns in Lombardy